Dinuba is a city in Tulare County, California, United States. The population was 21,453 at the 2010 census.  It is part of the  Visalia-Porterville metropolitan statistical area.  The Alta District Museum is located in Dinuba in a restored railroad station; the museum has a collection of materials that illustrate local history.

The name of the city is of unknown origin. While various theories about the origin exist, none have been verified. It probably is a fanciful name applied by railroad construction engineers at the time the branch line was built in this area. The city's original name was Sibleyville, named for James Sibley, who deeded 240 acres to the Pacific Improvement Company (Southern Pacific Company).

Geography
Dinuba is located at  (36.544898, -119.389260).

The gradient is approximately ten feet per mile, from east-northeast to west-southwest. Groundwater generally also flows with the surface of the terrain; that is, from the northeast to the southwest.

Demographics

2010
The 2010 United States Census reported that Dinuba had a population of 21,453. The racial makeup of Dinuba was 11,166 (52.0%) White, 141 (0.7%) African American, 193 (0.9%) Native American, 454 (2.1%) Asian, 17 (0.1%) Pacific Islander, 8,630 (40.2%) from other races, and 852 (4.0%) from two or more races. Hispanic or Latino of any race were 18,114 persons (84.4%).

The Census reported that 21,291 people (99.2% of the population) lived in households, 77 (0.4%) lived in non-institutionalized group quarters, and 85 (0.4%) were institutionalized.

There were 5,593 households, out of which 3,275 (58.6%) had children under the age of 18 living in them, 3,162 (56.5%) were opposite-sex married couples living together, 1,077 (19.3%) had a female householder with no husband present, 481 (8.6%) had a male householder with no wife present.  There were 544 (9.7%) unmarried opposite-sex partnerships, and 37 (0.7%) same-sex married couples or partnerships. 672 households (12.0%) were made up of individuals, and 324 (5.8%) had someone living alone who was 65 years of age or older. The average household size was 3.81.  There were 4,720 families (84.4% of all households); the average family size was 4.04.

The population was spread out, with 7,495 people (34.9%) under the age of 18, 2,476 people (11.5%) aged 18 to 24, 5,881 people (27.4%) aged 25 to 44, 3,920 people (18.3%) aged 45 to 64, and 1,681 people (7.8%) who were 65 years of age or older.  The median age was 27.2 years. For every 100 females, there were 103.3 males.  For every 100 females age 18 and over, there were 101.4 males.

The homeowner vacancy rate was 2.3%; the rental vacancy rate was 4.2%.  11,975 people (55.8% of the population) lived in owner-occupied housing units and 9,316 people (43.4%) lived in rental housing units.

2000
As of the census of 2000, there were 16,504 people, 4,493 households, and 3,724 families residing in the city. The racial makeup of the city was 49.34% White, 0.34% African American, 1.28% Native American, 2.42% Asian, 0.14% Pacific Islander, 37.98% from other races, and 5.28% from two or more races. Hispanic or Latino of any race were 79.08% of the population.

There were 4,493 households, out of which 52.3% had children under the age of 18 living with them, 59.8% were married couples living together, 16.6% had a female householder with no husband present, and 17.1% were non-families. 14.4% of all households were made up of individuals, and 8.4% had someone living alone who was 65 years of age or older.  The average household size was 3.72 and the average family size was 4.02.

In the city, the age distribution of the population shows 35.8% under the age of 18, 12.7% from 18 to 24, 27.5% from 25 to 44, 15.0% from 45 to 64, and 9.1% who were 65 years of age or older.  The median age was 26 years. For every 100 females, there were 103.2 males.  For every 100 females age 18 and over, there were 101.1 males.

The median income for a household in the city was $33,345, and the median income for a family was $33,769. Males had a median income of $23,663 versus $25,364 for females. The per capita income for the city was $11,566.  About 31.1% of families and 26.2% of the population were below the poverty line, including 37.1% of those under age 18 and 12.3% of those age 65 or over.

Politics

President George W. Bush made a visit to this small community in October 2003 to commemorate Ruiz Foods' 40th anniversary.

Economy
Dinuba is home to the food company Ruiz Foods.

Top employers
According to Dinuba's 2011 Comprehensive Annual Financial Report, the top employers in the city are:

Notable people
Stephen H. Burum, cinematographer
Cruz Bustamante, 45th Lieutenant Governor of California
Miguel Contreras, farmworker, organizer with the United Farm Workers Union and Labor Leader
Bryce Seligman DeWitt, theoretical physicist, author of seminal work in quantum gravity
Ike Frankian, American football player
Ester Hernandez, an artist of the Chicano Movement
Dylan Lee, relief pitcher for the Atlanta Braves 
Earl Kim, Korean-American composer
Russ Letlow, NFL player for the Green Bay Packers
Doris Matsui, member of the United States House of Representatives, grew up in Dinuba.
William Michaelian, novelist, short story writer, poet
Manuel Muñoz, short story writer
Oswald Hope Robertson, founder of the world's first blood bank
Burt Rutan, founder of Scaled Composites, designer of both the Voyager aircraft and SpaceShipOne, the world's first non-governmental spacecraft
Claramae Turner, opera singer, film actress
Rose Ann Vuich, California's first woman State Senator, local park namesake

Sister cities
 Uruapan, Mexico
 Malsch, Germany

References

External links

1906 establishments in California
Cities in Tulare County, California
Incorporated cities and towns in California
Populated places established in 1906
Chicano and Mexican neighborhoods in California